A military ordinariate is an ecclesiastical jurisdiction of the Catholic Church, of the Latin or an Eastern church, responsible for the pastoral care of Catholics serving in the armed forces of a nation.

Until 1986, they were called "military vicariates" and had a status similar to that of apostolic vicariates, which are headed by a bishop who receives his authority by delegation from the Pope. The apostolic constitution Spirituali militum curae of 21 April 1986 raised their status, declaring that the bishop who heads one of them is an "ordinary", holding authority by virtue of his office, and not by delegation from another person in authority. It likened the military vicariates to dioceses. Each of them is headed by a bishop, who may have the personal rank of archbishop. If the bishop is a diocesan rather than a titular bishop, he is likely to delegate the daily functions to an auxiliary bishop or a lower cleric.

Some nations have military ordinariates of the Anglican Communion, Lutheranism, and Eastern Orthodoxy.

The personal ordinariates for Anglicans entering the Catholic Church announced on 20 October 2009 are similar in some ways to the existing military ordinariates. But the jurisdiction of military ordinariates is cumulative to that of the diocesan bishops.

List of Catholic military ordinariates

See also

Military chaplain
Patron saints of the military
 Blue Mass

References

External links
Military Ordinariates in the world by GCatholic.org
Catholic Hierarchy.org